Ian Eskelin (born October 17, 1969), is a record producer, songwriter, solo artist, and founding member and lead singer of the Grammy-nominated Christian rock band All Star United, and president of recording and publishing company Radiate Music. He won the Dove Award for "Producer of the Year" in 2011 and 2008, and was nominated for the same award in 2007, 2009, 2010, and 2012. Eskelin also has received multiple Dove and Grammy nominations for his songwriting and production work working with artists such as Francesca Battistelli "Holy Spirit", 7eventh Time Down "God Is on the Move", Sidewalk Prophets, Chris August, and Hawk Nelson to name a few. As an artist and writer Eskelin has had more than fifty Top 10 singles in the United States, including 25 No. 1 charting songs. He has additionally had international No. 1 songs in various countries including Japan, Singapore, and Australia. Ian's songs have been licensed for use on major networks including ABC, CBS, NBC, FOX, ESPN and feature films.

Biography 
Eskelin was born in Springfield, Missouri, where he attended Eugene Field Elementary School. While attending high school in Charlotte, North Carolina, he was a DJ and dance music artist, playing keyboard for a local band that opened for C+C Music Factory and Information Society. He started attending Wheaton College, where he roomed with Rob Bell. During this time, Eskelin released a rave record under the name "Zero" (1992), and also recorded under the name "Brand New Language", which released an independent tape as well as an album with Wonderland Records (1993). He briefly joined the band Code of Ethics before releasing a second solo album under the name "iAN", titled Supersonic Dream Day (1994). In 1997, Eskelin formed the power-pop band All Star United.

Awards and nominations 
 1998 Grammy Awards - nominated for Gospel Rock Album - All Star United (artist, producer writer)
 1998 Dove Awards - nominated for Modern Rock/Alternative Recorded Song of the Year - "La La Land" (artist, producer, writer)
 1999 Dove Awards - nominated for New Artist of the Year
 2007 Dove Awards
won for Rock/Contemporary Recorded Song of the Year ("Me and Jesus" by Stellar Kart)
nominated for Producer of the Year, Song of the Year ("Me and Jesus"), and Rock/Contemporary Album of the Year (We Can't Stand Sitting Down by Stellar Kart)
 2008 Dove Awards - won for Producer of the Year
 2009 Dove Awards - nominated for Producer of the Year, Song of the Year, Pop/Contemporary Recorded Song of the Year ("I'm Letting Go" by Francesca Battistelli), Rock Recorded Song of the Year ("Shine Like the Stars" by Stellar Kart), Rock/Contemporary Album of the Year (Daylight Is Coming by Remedy Drive and Expect the Impossible by Stellar Kart), Pop/Contemporary Album of the Year (My Paper Heart by Francesca Battistelli), and Special Event Album of the Year (Your Name)
 2010 Dove Awards - nominated for Producer of the Year and Pop/Contemporary Album of the Year (These Simple Truths by Sidewalk Prophets)
 2011 Dove Awards
won for Producer of the Year and Pop/Contemporary Recorded Song of the Year ("Beautiful Beautiful" by Francesca Battistelli)
nominated for Song of the Year ("Beautiful Beautiful")
 2012 Dove Awards - nominated for Producer of the Year, Pop/Contemporary Album of the Year (Hundred More Years by Francesca Battistelli), Rock/Contemporary Album of the Year (Crazy Love by Hawk Nelson), and Rock/Contemporary Recorded Song of the Year ("Crazy Love" by Hawk Nelson)
 2013 Dove Awards
nominated for Producer of the Year
nominated for Country Album of the Year ("A Thousand Little Things" by Point of Grace)
nominated for Christmas Album of the Year (Christmas by Francesca Battistelli)
 2014 Dove Awards Rock Song of the Year, Veridia, "We Are The Brave"
2015 Dove Awards - nominated for Rock Song of the Year ("Furious Love" by Veridia)
2014 Grammy Awards - nominated for Best Contemporary Christian Album (If We're Honest by Francesca Battistelli)

Credits 
Heidi Montag, Glitter and Glory, 2019, Producer, writer
Pearl City Worship, We Won't Be Silent, 2016, Producer, writer
Austin & Lindsey Adamec, Walk on Waves, 2016, Producer, writer
Needtobreathe, Wasteland (radio single), 2015, Producer
Jeremy Camp, I Will Follow, 2015, writer
The Neverclaim, The Joy, 2015 - Producer, writer
7eventh Time Down, God Is on the Move, 2015 - Producer, writer
About a Mile, Taking Back (radio single), 2015, Producer, writer
Chris August, The Maker, 2015, writer
Aaron Buchholz, Close To Christmas (radio single), 2015, Producer, writer
Kutless, Surrender, 2015, Producer, writer
VERIDIA, Pretty Lies, 2015, writer
About a Mile, About A Mile, 2014 - Producer, writer
VERIDIA, Inseparable, 2014 - Producer, writer
Kutless, Glory, 2014 - Producer, writer
Ashes Remain, Here for a Reason, 2014 - Producer
Francesca Battistelli, If We're Honest, 2014 - Producer, writer
Newsboys, Restart, 2013, writer
7eventh Time Down, Just Say Jesus, 2013 - Producer, writer
Everfound, Everfound, 2013 - Writer
Francesca Battistelli, Christmas, 2012 - Producer, writer
Chris August, The Upside of Down, 2012 - Producer, writer
Moriah Peters, I Choose Jesus, 2012 - Writer
Grace Chapel Live, Freedom Songs, 2012 - Writer
Sidewalk Prophets, Live Like That, 2012 - Producer, writer
Point of Grace, A Thousand Little Things, 2012 - Producer, writer
Tim Rushlow, Rain Down on Me, 2011 - Producer, writer
Dara Maclean, You Got My Attention, 2011 - Producer, writer
Francesca Battistelli, Hundred More Years, 2011 – Producer, writer
Francesca Battistelli, My Paper Heart, 2009 – Producer, writer
Hawk Nelson, Crazy Love, 2011 – Producer, writer
Jason Castro, Who I Am, 2010 – Producer
Stellar Kart, Everything Is Different Now, 2010 - Producer, writer
Chris August, No Far Away, 2010 - Writer
Sidewalk Prophets, These Simple Truths, 2009 - Producer, writer
Remedy Drive, Daylight Is Coming, 2008 - Producer, writer
Veggie Tales, Bob and Larry Boy Sing the 80's, 2010 - Producer
Veggie Tales, Sweetpea Beauty DVD "Pants", 2010 - Writer
Newsong, One True God, 2011 - Producer, writer
Glenn Packiam, The Kingdom Comes, 2011 - Writer
Nathan Tasker, Something Beautiful, 2011 - Writer
Aaron Shust, Take Over, 2009 - Writer
Starfield, Saving One, 2010 - Producer, writer
Mark Schultz, Broken & Beautiful, writer
33 Miles, Today, 2010 - Producer, writer
Avalon, Reborn, 2010 - Producer, writer
Avalon, Stand, 2006 - Writer
Avalon, The Creed, 2006 - Writer
Stellar Kart, Everything Is Different Now, 2010 - Producer, writer
Stellar Kart, Expect the Impossible, 2009 - Producer, writer
Stellar Kart, We Can't Stand Sitting Down, 2008 - Producer, writer
Warren Barfield, Worth Fighting For, 2008 - Writer
Krystal Meyers, Krystal Meyers, 2005 - Producer, writer
Krystal Meyers, Dying for a Heart, 2006 - Producer, writer
Your Name, Your Name, 2008 - Artist, Producer, writer
Sarah Reeves, Sweet Sweet Sound, 2009 - Producer
MDO, Sabe A Ti, 2008 - Writer
Our Hearts Hero, Our Hearts Hero, 2007 - Producer, writer
Everyday Sunday, Wake Up! Wake Up!, 2007 - Producer, writer
Joy Williams, Genesis, 2006 - Writer
Jessie Daniels, Jessie Daniels, 2006 - Writer
Eleventyseven, Galactic Conquest, 2007 - Producer, writer
Seven Glory, Atmosphere, 2007 - Producer, writer
Brian Litrell, Welcome Home, 2006 - Writer
Jump5, Beautiful To Me, 2005 - Writer
pureNRG, pureNRG, 2008 - Writer
The Rubyz, The Rubyz, 2008 - Writer
Robert Pierre, Identity, 2009 - Writer
Me in Motion, Me in Motion, 2010 - Producer, writer
Tricia Brock, The Road, 2011 - Writer
The Martins, New Day, 2011 -  Writer
Attaboy, California and Wait on You, 2010 - Producer, writer
All Star United, The Good Album, 2010 - Artist, Producer, writer
All Star United, Love and Radiation, 2007 - Artist, Producer, writer
All Star United, Revolution, 2002 - Artist, Producer, writer
All Star United, Let's Get Crazy, 2000 - Artist, Producer, writer
All Star United, International Anthems For the Human Race, 1998 - Artist, writer
All Star United, All Star United, 1997 - Artist, Producer, writer
Ian Eskelin, Save The Humans, 2004 - Artist, Producer, writer
Ian Eskelin, Super Sonic Dream Day, 1994 - Artist, Producer, writer
Ian Eskelin, Brand New Language, 1993 - Artist, writer
Zero, Ravenous, 1992 - Artist, Producer, writer
B.I.G, Pure Pop For Now People, 1999 - Producer, writer
Hypersonic, Hymns in the House, 1995 - Producer
Hypersonic, Praise House, 1996 - Producer
Hypersonic, Praise House 2, 1997 - Producer

Compilations
WOW Hits 2006 - Producer, writer
WOW Hits 2007 - Producer, writer
WOW Next 2007 - Writer
WOW Hits 2008 - Producer, writer
WOW Hits 2009 - Producer, writer
WOW Hits 2010 - Producer

Music videos
Supersonic Dream Day (Supersonic Dream Day)
Bright Red Carpet (All Star United)
Weirdo (Revolution)
Sweet Jesus (Revolution)

Live videos
Taboo (Save the Humans)

References

Sources

External links
 

Wheaton College (Illinois) alumni
1969 births
Living people
American performers of Christian music
Musicians from Missouri
Inpop Records artists